Yakup Şener (born September 1, 1990 in Trabzon, Turkey) is a  Turkish amateur boxer competing in the light welterweight division.

He studied physical education and sports at the Black Sea Technical University's Vocational College.

In 2006, Şener became bronze medalist in the -54 kg division at the World Cadets Championships held in Istanbul, Turkey. He qualified for the 2012 Summer Olympics, to do so had to win every single fight at the Olympic qualifier held in his hometown.

At the Olympics proper he beat Serge Ambomo of Cameroon, then lost to Uzbek Uktamjon Rahmonov.

References

1990 births
Sportspeople from Trabzon
Karadeniz Technical University alumni
Living people
Light-welterweight boxers
Fenerbahçe boxers
Olympic boxers of Turkey
Boxers at the 2012 Summer Olympics
Turkish male boxers
21st-century Turkish people